The 1928 New Year Honours in New Zealand were appointments by King George V on the advice of the New Zealand government to various orders and honours to reward and highlight good works by New Zealanders. The awards celebrated the passing of 1927 and the beginning of 1928, and were announced on 2 January 1928.

The recipients of honours are displayed here as they were styled before their new honour.

Knight Bachelor
 The Honourable Thomas Walter Stringer  – lately a judge of the Supreme Court.

Order of Saint Michael and Saint George

Companion (CMG)
 George Craig – comptroller of customs.
 Albert Fuller Ellis – New Zealand member of the British Phosphate Commission.

References

New Year Honours
1928 awards
1928 in New Zealand
New Zealand awards